Theodore-Henri Fresson (18651951) was an agronomist. He is the inventor of a photographic paper, Charbon-Satin, a type of carbon print. It uses pigment rather than dye, and is generally stable. The process has been kept secret but is still practised by members of his family.

References 

1865 births
1951 deaths
French agronomists
French inventors